Bir Zamanlar Çukurova is a Turkish romantic drama series that broadcast on ATV Turkey between September 13, 2018 and June 16, 2022.

Plot 
During the 70s, the couple in love Züleyha and Yılmaz decide to hide their identities due to the murder that Yilmaz had committed to protect his beloved from a sexual assault, so they decide to embark on a train trip from Istanbul to the unknown.

Fate takes them to the fertile region of Çukurova, specifically to the Adana Province, where they decide to stay and work on Hünkar Yaman's farm together with his son Demir, who will fall in love with the young woman without knowing that his heart belongs to Yılmaz. However, in order to obtain accommodation and work, the couple pretend to be brothers, something that Demir will not know until then, many unexpected things will happen.

Cast

Series overview

Production 
The series is produced by Timur Savcı, Burak Sağyaşar, Burak Topuzlu and Turan Bayat, in collaboration with the production house Tims&B Productions.

Filming 
The series was filmed in the cities of Adana and Mersin, Turkey. The hospital shooting in the series was done at Nusret Karasu Chest Disease Hospital. One of the shooting locations was Varda Viaduct, located in Hacıkırı in Karaisalı of Adana Province.

References

External links 
 
 

2018 Turkish television series debuts
2022 Turkish television series endings
Turkish television soap operas
Turkish romantic comedy television series
Turkish drama television series
Television series produced in Istanbul
Television shows set in Istanbul
Television series set in the 2010s
Turkish-language television shows